High Energy Stereoscopic System (H.E.S.S.) is a system of imaging atmospheric Cherenkov telescopes (IACTs) for the investigation of cosmic gamma rays in the photon energy range of 0.03 to 100 TeV. The acronym was chosen in honour of Victor Hess, who was the first to observe cosmic rays.

The name also emphasizes two main features of the installation, namely the simultaneous observation of air showers with several telescopes, under different viewing angles, and the combination of telescopes to a large system to increase the effective detection area for gamma rays. H.E.S.S. permits the exploration of gamma-ray sources with intensities at a level of a few thousandth parts of the flux of the Crab Nebula.

H.E.S.S. consists of five telescopes: four with mirrors just under 12 m in diameter, arranged as a square with 120 m sides, and one larger telescope with a 28 m mirror, located at the centre of the array. The four 12 m telescopes  began operation in 2004, with the 28 m telescope added as an upgrade (called H.E.S.S. II) in 2012.

As with other gamma-ray telescopes, H.E.S.S. observes high energy processes in the universe. Gamma-ray producing sources include supernova remnants, active galactic nuclei and pulsar wind nebulae. It also actively tests unproven theories in physics such as looking for the predicted gamma-ray annihilation signal from WIMP dark matter particles and testing Lorentz invariance predictions of loop quantum gravity.

H.E.S.S. is located on the Cranz family farm, Göllschau, in Namibia, near the Gamsberg, an area well known for its excellent optical quality. The first of the four telescopes of Phase I of the H.E.S.S. project went into operation in Summer 2002; all four were operational in December 2003.

In 2004 H.E.S.S. was the first IACT experiment to spatially resolve a source of cosmic gamma rays.

In 2005, it was announced that H.E.S.S. had detected eight new high-energy gamma ray sources, doubling the known number of such sources. As of 2014, more than 90 sources of Tera-Electronvolt gamma-rays were discovered by H.E.S.S.

In 2016, the HESS collaboration reported deep gamma ray observations which show the presence of petaelectronvolt protons originating from the supermassive black hole at central of Milky Way, and therefore should be considered as a viable alternative to supernova remnants as a source of petaelectronvolt Galactic cosmic rays.

See also
Werner Hofmann (physicist)

References

External links
High Energy Stereoscopic System Project (H.E.S.S.) on the internet
Nature: High energy particle acceleration in the shell of a supernova remnant
Science: A new population of very high energy gamma-ray sources in the Milky Way
New Scientist: Number of very high-energy gamma ray sources doubles
Aspera European network portal
HESS experiment record on INSPIRE-HEP

Gamma-ray telescopes
Astronomical observatories in Namibia
Particle experiments